The 2021 America East Conference men's soccer tournament was the postseason men's soccer tournament for the America East Conference held from November 6 through November 14, 2021. The five-match tournament took place at campus sites, with the higher seed hosting. The six-team single-elimination tournament consisted of three rounds based on seeding from regular season conference play. The defending champions were the New Hampshire, who were unable to defend their title, losing in the Final. Vermont won their first tournament in program history after a 1–0 victory in the final over New Hampshire.  It was the sixth victory for the Vermont Catamounts soccer program and the first for Head Coach Rob Dow. As tournament champions, Vermont earned the America East's automatic berth into the 2021 NCAA Division I men's soccer tournament.

Seeding 
The top six teams in the regular season earned a spot in the tournament, with the top two seeds receiving byes into the Semifinals.  NJIT and UMass Lowell finished the regular season tied for the sixth and final tournament spot, with a conference record of 3–5–0. NJIT qualified for the tournament by virtue of their 2–1 overtime win over UMass Lowell on September 18.

Bracket

Schedule

Quarterfinals

Semifinals

Final

Statistics

Goalscorers

All-Tournament team 

Source:

MVP in bold

References 

 
America East Conference Men's Soccer Tournament